John S. Norris (1804 – July 25, 1876) was an American architect.

He was born and raised in New York City, where he began his career as a mason. He advanced to being a builder and eventually listed himself in the telephone directory as an architect.

He went to Wilmington, North Carolina, in 1839, where he first supervised construction, and then received his first independent commission to design the Wilmington Custom House in 1843. While working on that commission, he was asked to design the Savannah Custom House in Savannah, Georgia, which was built from 1848 to 1852.  This led to numerous commissions in Savannah, including the Andrew Low House, the Mercer House, Massie Common School House and the Green-Meldrim House.  Norris also designed the Unitarian Church, which was originally built in 1853 on Oglethorpe Square; this church was designed for free people of color. The church has since been moved to Troup Square, where it is now The Unitarian Universalist Church of Savannah. Norris also designed light houses for the Savannah River and Cockspur Island.

Personal life
In 1853 Norris purchased what is now known as the Blauvelt-Norris-Burr-House in Blauvelt, New York, where he lived until his death in 1876 at the age of 72.

Norris was married to Sarah Ann, who died on May 23, 1865, at the age of 50.

Norris' daughter, Josephine M. Barlow, died on May 15, 1864, of heart disease. She had married Frederick C. Barlow three years earlier.

Publications
 John S. Norris: Architect in Savannah, Mary Lane Morrison (1980)

Gallery

References

1804 births
1876 deaths
Architects from New York City
19th-century American architects